Tornus may refer to:
 Tornus (insect anatomy), an entomology term for the posterior corner of the wing
 Tornus (gastropod), a gastropod genus in the family Tornidae

Biology disambiguation pages